Oligoarthritis (from Greek oligos - 'few') is defined as arthritis affecting two to four joints during the first six months of disease.

Types 
Two subcategories are recognized:

 Persistent oligoarthritis: Affecting not more than 4 joints throughout the disease course
 Extended oligoarthritis: Affecting a total of more than 4 joints after the first 6 months of disease

Notes

References 
 Medical Glossary of the Spondylitis Association of America
 Pauciarticular juvenile rheumatoid arthritis (oligoarthritis)
 About Oligoarthritis

Arthritis